Terje Wold (23 August 1899 – 6 September 1972) was a Norwegian judge and politician for the Labour Party.

Terje Wold was born in Evenes. He graduated as cand.jur. in 1921. He worked as a jurist, becoming a Supreme Court Justice of Norway in 1950. From 1958 to 1969 he was the 15th Chief Justice of the Supreme Court. He was a member of the United Nations War Crimes Commission from 1945 to 1946 and the European Court of Human Rights from 1959 to 1972. He presided at the World Association of Judges from 1969 to 1972.

Wold was appointed Minister of Justice during the cabinet Nygaardsvold, and sat from 1939 to 1945. From 1940 to 1942 he was acting Minister of Trade. He was elected to the Norwegian Parliament from Finnmark in 1945, and served one term. On the local level he had been a member of Vadsø city council from 1925 to 1928 and 1931 to 1936, serving as mayor in 1928 and 1934 to 1936. From 1937 to 1939 he was a member of Tromsø city council.
 
He published several books. He was appointed Commander with Star of the Order of St. Olav in 1958.

References

1899 births
1972 deaths
People from Evenes
Labour Party (Norway) politicians
Government ministers of Norway
Members of the Storting
Mayors of Vadsø
Politicians from Tromsø
Chief justices of Norway
20th-century Norwegian politicians
Ministers of Justice of Norway